Gilbert's dunnart (Sminthopsis gilberti) is a recently discovered dunnart, described in 1984.

Distribution and habitat
Gilbert's dunnart is found in the southern wheat belt of Western Australia close to Perth and the Swan River, as well as the Roe plain near the South Australian border. The habitat it inhabits consists of heath and heathy forest and is abundant on coastal rangers, dry sclerophyll forest, semi-arid woodlands, and mallee scrub.

Social organisation and breeding
This nocturnal species nests in hollows above ground or dense bush. Gilbert's dunnart breeds from September until December and young are weaned in January or February.

Diet
Gilbert's dunnart primarily eats insects.

References

External links
Pictures and facts about the Gilbert's dunnart
Australian Biological Resources Study

Dasyuromorphs
Mammals of Western Australia
Marsupials of Australia
Mammals described in 1984
Taxa named by Darrell Kitchener